The Cuban dogfish (Squalus cubensis) is a dogfish, a member of the family Squalidae in the order Squaliformes.

Distribution and habitat
It is found in the Western Atlantic from North Carolina to Florida, in the Gulf of Mexico, around Cuba, Hispaniola, southern Brazil, and Argentina. It inhabits continental shelves and uppermost slopes at depths from 60 to 380 m.

Description
It is a slim, gray shark with black tips to its dorsal fins black and at the edges of its pectoral fins, its pelvic and caudal fins are white; It possess a spine at front edge of each of its two dorsal fans. Its length may reach 110 cm. It probably feeds on bottom fishes and invertebrates. The isopod parasites which commonly infest the mouth and gills of marine fish are unusually large in the Cuban dogfish. Its reproduction is ovoviviparous, with 10 pups in a litter. It is not generally used for food, but taken commercially for the oil and vitamins extracted from its liver.

Gallery

References

Cuban dogfish
Fish of Cuba
Fish of the Dominican Republic
Fish of the Western Atlantic
Cuban dogfish